Championship Round of the 2009 World Baseball Classic was held at Dodger Stadium, Los Angeles, California, United States, from March 21 to 23, 2009.

Championship round was a single-elimination tournament. In the final, the team with the higher winning percentage of games in the tournament were to be the home team. If the teams competing in the final had identical winning percentages in the tournament, then World Baseball Classic, Inc. (WBCI) would conduct a coin flip or draw to determine the home team.

Bracket

Results
All times are Pacific Daylight Time (UTC−07:00).

Semifinal 1 − South Korea 10, Venezuela 2

Semifinal 2 − Japan 9, United States 4

Final − Japan 5, South Korea 3

South Korea won the coin flip held after the second semifinal between Japan and the United States, designating them as the home team for the final.

Japan drew first blood, scoring on a RBI single by Michihiro Ogasawara in the third inning. Shin-Soo Choo tied the score 1−all with a home run in the fifth inning. With runners on first and third, Hiroyuki Nakajima hit an RBI single to bring Seiichi Uchikawa home to give Japan the lead 2−1. South Korea failed to take advantage of Japanese pitcher Hisashi Iwakuma, who was visibly tired, when they failed to score in the seventh inning, when Iwakuma was relieved by Toshiya Sugiuchi after two outs. Uchikawa hit a single to start the eighth. Atsunori Inaba scored a double to put Uchikawa in scoring position, and Uchikawa scored on Akinori Iwamura's sacrifice fly. Hyun-wook Jong retired the remaining batters to close out the inning.

Japan brought out their closer, Yu Darvish, for the bottom of the ninth with a 3−2 lead. Darvish struck out Keun-woo Jeong, but walked Hyun-soo Kim and Tae-kyun Kim to put South Koreans on first and second with one out. Darvish then struck out Choo and was one out away from saving the game. But Bum-ho Lee singled, driving in Jong-wook Lee for the game-tying run to make it 3–all and send the game into extra innings.

Japan batted first, with Chang-yong Lim pitching for South Korea in the tenth. Uchikawa and Iwamura hit a single to put runners on first and third with two out. Ichiro was one strike away from ending the inning when he hit a line-drive single up the middle that scored Iwamura and Uchikawa. Lim then hit Nakajima with a pitch and intentionally walked Norichika Aoki to face Kenji Johjima who was hitless up to that point. Lim was able to strikeout Johjima and send the game to the bottom of the tenth. Darvish made short work of South Korea, capping with a strikeout of Keun-woo Jeong to clinch Japan's successful defense of their 2006 championship.

Japan's Daisuke Matsuzaka was awarded the tournament MVP for the second consecutive time, with a 3−0 record and 2.45 ERA.

References

External links
Official website

Championship
World Baseball Classic championship
World Baseball Classic championship
Baseball competitions in Los Angeles
International baseball competitions hosted by the United States
International sports competitions in California
World Baseball Classic championship